56 Nevsky Prospect may refer to:
 Eliseyev Emporium (Saint Petersburg)
 Saint Petersburg Comedy Theatre